The 1949 Ohio State Buckeyes football team represented Ohio State University in the 1949 Big Nine Conference football season. The Buckeyes compiled a 7–1–2 record to win a share of the Big Ten Conference title and win their first Rose Bowl against California.

Schedule

Game summaries

USC
 Fred "Curly" Morrison 134 rushing yards, Gerald Krall 103 rushing yards

Coaching staff
 Wes Fesler, head coach, first year
 Lyal Clark, assistant
 Gene Fekete, assistant
 Richard Fisher, assistant
 Esco Sarkkinen, assistant
 Harry Strobel, assistant

Statistics
 Rushing: Gerald Krall 128 attempts, 606 yards, 4 TD
 Passing: Pandel Savic 35/84, 581 yards, 6 TD, 4 INT
 Receiving: Ray Hamilton 15 receptions, 347 yards
 Points: Fred Morrison 54 points (9 TD)

Awards and honors
 All-Big Ten: C Jack Lininger, HB Gerry Krall

1950 NFL draftees

References

Ohio State
Ohio State Buckeyes football seasons
Big Ten Conference football champion seasons
Rose Bowl champion seasons
Ohio State Buckeyes football